Suzie Plakson is an American actress.

Early life and education 
Born Susan Plaksin in Buffalo, New York, she was raised in Kingston, Pennsylvania and attended Northwestern University.

Career 
Plakson began her career on the stage, and played four characters opposite Anthony Newley in the national revival tour of Stop the World, I Want to Get Off. She also played Marquise Theresa Du Parc in the Broadway production of La Bête.

Plakson was a regular in the sitcom Love & War, as sportswriter Mary Margaret "Meg" Tynan. She played four characters on various Star Trek series: a Vulcan, Doctor Selar, in "The Schizoid Man" (Star Trek: The Next Generation); half-Klingon, half-human Ambassador K'Ehleyr in "The Emissary" (Star Trek: The Next Generation) and "Reunion" (Star Trek: The Next Generation); the Lady Q in "The Q and the Grey" (Star Trek: Voyager); and an Andorian, Tarah, in "Cease Fire" (Star Trek: Enterprise).

Plakson played the blue brontosaurus real estate agent Monica de Vertebrae on Dinosaurs, as well as many other guest voices. She has had recurring roles in various sitcoms such as Mad About You, Everybody Loves Raymond and How I Met Your Mother. She has appeared in movies such as Disclosure, Red Eye and Wag the Dog.

Plakson wrote and performed an allegorical solo show, An Evening with Eve. Plakson penned and performed the alternative country rock album DidnWannaDoIt! produced by Jay Ferguson, and released the video of the title song on YouTube. She wrote and recorded the audiobook/e-book, The Return of King Lillian, a mythic allegory.

Filmography

Film

Television

Video games

References

External links 

 
 
 Suzie Plakson at StarTrek.com
 
 

Living people
20th-century American actresses
21st-century American actresses
Actresses from Buffalo, New York
American film actresses
American television actresses
American video game actresses
American voice actresses
Sculptors from New York (state)
Writers from New York (state)
Year of birth missing (living people)